Sarai is a rural locality (a selo) in Stukovsky Selsoviet, Pavlovsky District, Altai Krai, Russia. The population was 410 as of 2013. There are 3 streets.

Geography 
Sarai is located 34 km southeast of Pavlovsk (the district's administrative centre) by road. Cheryomnoye is the nearest rural locality.

References 

Rural localities in Pavlovsky District, Altai Krai